Zoran Stavreski (born 29 October 1964 in Ohrid) is Macedonian politician and formerly Deputy Prime Minister in charge of Finance.

Education 
Graduated from the Faculty of Economics of the Ss. Cyril and Methodius University of Skopje in 1987. In 1997 he received the degree of Master of Economics. Fluent in English.

Career 
In 1993–2000 he was an advisor and head of the Research Office of the Macedonian National Bank. In 2001 he was undersecretary in the Ministry of Finance. In 2001–2006 he worked in various positions at the World Bank.

Family 
Married and has one child.

References

External links 
 Official website of the Deputy Prime Minister of the Republic of Macedonia

1964 births
Finance ministers of North Macedonia
Deputy Prime Ministers of North Macedonia
Government ministers of North Macedonia
VMRO-DPMNE politicians
Living people
Macedonian economists
People from Ohrid
Ss. Cyril and Methodius University of Skopje alumni